KEJL is a radio station airing a classic rock format licensed to Humble City, New Mexico, broadcasting on 1110 kHz AM.  The station serves the Hobbs, New Mexico area, and is owned by Noalmark Broadcasting Corporation.

Engineering
Chief Engineer is Kenneth S. Fine, CPBE

References

External links

Classic rock radio stations in the United States
EJL
Noalmark Broadcasting Corporation radio stations
EJL
Radio stations established in 1971
1971 establishments in New Mexico